Clement Bernard (Clem) Campbell OAM (born 16 August 1948) is a former Australian state politician and was a member of the Parliament of Queensland from 1983 to 1998.

Campbell obtained a Bachelor of Agricultural degree and later worked as a Research and Regional Economist with the Queensland Department of Primary Industries. He was elected to the Legislative Assembly of Queensland for Bundaberg at the 1983 election, representing the Labor Party, and held the seat until the 1998 election. He served as a member of various Parliamentary Committees during the term of the Wayne Goss Labor government.

After Campbell's retirement from Parliament he joined the staff of Griffith University in Brisbane.

As of 2008, Campbell is the founding chairman of Green Cross Australia and current chair of Earth Charter Australia. He is also a director with Football Queensland.

In 2013, Clem Campbell became the United Nations Association of Australia Queensland President.

In 2014, Mr Campbell was awarded the Order of Australia Medal for his contribution to the community as an outstanding advocate for peace and environmental education and leadership in promoting ethics in public life.

References

1948 births
Living people
Members of the Queensland Legislative Assembly
Australian Labor Party members of the Parliament of Queensland